Manuel António Vassalo e Silva (8 November 1899 – 11 August 1985) was an officer of the Portuguese Army and an overseas administrator. He was the 128th and the last Governor-General of Portuguese India.

Background
He was the only son of Manuel Caetano da Silva (1870–1926) and his wife Maria da Encarnação Vassalo (1869–1922), and was the brother of the feminist author and anti-government campaigner Maria Lamas. He was married, with two daughters, Joana and Aurora.

Governor-General of Portuguese India
In 1958, he was nominated to replace Paulo Bénard Guedes as the 128th Governor-General of the Portuguese State of India.  At the same time, he was also appointed Commander-in-Chief of the Portuguese Armed Forces in India.

When the Republic of India sought to annex the territories of Goa, Daman (from which had been previously separated in 1954 and annexed by India in 1961 the enclave of Dadra and Nagar Haveli) and Diu from Portuguese control in December 1961, Manuel Vassalo e Silva, recognizing the futility of facing a superior enemy, disobeyed direct orders from the President of the Council of Ministers (Prime Minister) of Portugal António de Oliveira Salazar to fight to the death and surrendered the following day to the Indian invasion, following several losses and the destruction of a battleship.  After that he fell into disgrace at the eyes of Salazar, who never accepted the fait accompli of the annexation.

Vassalo e Silva was greeted with a hostile reception when he returned to Portugal.  He was subsequently court martialed for failing to follow orders, expelled from the military and was sent into exile.  His rank and freedom were restored only in 1974, after the fall of the regime, and he was given back his military status.  He was later able to conduct a state visit to Goa, where he was given a warm reception.

Recently  the Goan-Portuguese politician Narana Coissoró said that Salazar sent him a cyanide capsule for use in case of defeat  .

Family
He was married to Fernanda Pereira e Silva Monteiro and had a son and two daughters: 
 Fernando Manuel Pereira Monteiro Vassalo e Silva (Lisbon, 6 December 1925 – Lisbon, 9 June 2006), married to Maria Amélia Franco Veiga (Lisbon, 20 March 1932 – 17 March 2004), daughter of António Veiga and wife Rosa Maria Garcia Franco, and had issue, seven children, two married and had issue
 Maria Fernanda Pereira Monteiro Vassalo e Silva, married to Rui António da Cunha Bernardino, and had issue, eight children, eight married and had issue, has now lots of grandchildren and great-grandchildren, the first having the name India. 
 Maria da Luz Pereira Monteiro Vassalo e Silva, married to António Faias Sors Lagrifa, born in Luanda, and had issue (their son Jorge Manuel Vassalo Sors Lagrifa (7 May 1948 – 6 February 2005) was the second husband without issue of Ana Cristina da Gama Caeiro da Mota Veiga, born in Lisbon, Santos o Velho, on 4 June 1950, daughter of António da Mota Veiga and wife Maria Emília da Gama Caeiro, formerly married and divorced from Marcelo Rebelo de Sousa)

References

1899 births
1985 deaths
People from Torres Novas
Governors-General of Portuguese India
Portuguese military officers